The BWI Marshall Airport Shuttle is a free bus service provided by Baltimore–Washington International Airport, that connects the airport terminal to BWI Rail Station. The free shuttle connects airport passengers to Amtrak and MARC trains, hence connecting the airport to Baltimore and Washington, D.C., as well as the rest of the Northeastern United States.

Established in 2004, the shuttle provides an essential link between intercity rail and the airport. The shuttle service connects to the Baltimore Light Rail incidentally due to the BWI Marshall Airport Light Rail Stop being located in Concourse E. Light Rail can be accessed from the shuttle at the line's last terminal stop at Doors 17 & 18.

The shuttle bus operates every 6 minutes from 5:00am to 1:00am daily, and every 25 minutes between 1:00am and 5:00am daily.

References

Transportation in Baltimore
Shuttle
2004 establishments in Maryland